Thomas Weber (born 29 May 1993) is an Austrian footballer who plays for SV Stripfing.

Club statistics

Updated to games played as of 16 June 2014.

References

External links

1993 births
Living people
Footballers from Vienna
Austrian footballers
Austria under-21 international footballers
Association football defenders
FC Admira Wacker Mödling players
Floridsdorfer AC players
Austrian Football Bundesliga players